This is a list of seasons played by Unión Deportiva Almería, S.A.D. in Spanish and European football, from 1947 (the years of Atlético Almería's foundation) to the most recent completed season.

This list details the club's achievements in all major competitions, and the top scorers for each season. Top scorers in bold were also the top scorers in the Spanish league that season. Only Copa del Rey is included.

Seasons

As Atlético Almería

As CD Hispania/CD Almería

As AD Almería

As Almería CF/UD Almería

Key

Pld = Matches played
W = Matches won
D = Matches drawn
L = Matches lost
GF = Goals for
GA = Goals against
Pts = Points
Pos = Final position
Pri = La Liga
Seg = Segunda División
Seg B = Segunda División B
Ter = Tercera División
Reg = Regional Leagues
UC = UEFA Cup
CL = UEFA Champions League
n/a = Not applicable
R1 = Round 1
R2 = Round 2
R3 = Round 3
R32 = Round of 16
R16 = Round of 16
QF = Quarter-finals
SF = Semi-finals
R/U = Runners-up
W = Winners

Note: bold text indicates a competition won.
''Note 2: Where fields are left blank, the club did not participate in a competition that season.

See also
UD Almería statistics
UD Almería managers

References

Seasons
Almeria
UD Almería seasons
Seasons